Yanhee International Hospital ( [roːŋpʰájaːbaːn jənhiː], YAHN-hee) is a multi-service general hospital in Bangkok, Thailand, that specializes in a range of medical and cosmetic services. Yanhee comprises a 15-story hospital building with a 400-bed capacity, 150 full-time doctors, 120 part-time health professionals, and 800 nurses. Additionally, Yanhee operates 95 outpatient examination rooms, 12 major and 30 minor operating rooms, an 18-bed Intensive Care Unit, emergency rooms, delivery rooms, a diagnostic laboratory and a nursery.

Site 
Yanhee International Hospital is located in the Bang-O, Bang Phlat District of northeastern Bangkok, on Charansanitwong Road. The hospital maintains 36 treatment centers in general medicine and cosmetics, serving about 2,000 outpatients daily and more than 100,000 social security enrollees. Yanhee operates 24 hours daily, with services provided by 130 full-time doctor specialists, 125 part-time specialists, and more than 1,500 healthcare professionals and support staff.

History 
Yanhee International Hospital was opened in 1984 as a small outpatient clinic by Dr. Supot Sumritvanitcha, M.D., N.D., who named the hospital after the Yanhee Power Plant located nearby. The hospital is now more well-known than the power plant (which has also since changed its name), and the original Yanhee International Hospital has been expanded many times over to include its numerous services.

Services and Medical Centers 
The following is a list of departments and special services offered at Yanhee International Hospital:

 Aesthetics (non-surgical)
 Aesthetic Gynecology Center
 Bariatric Surgery
 Cardiac Center
 Check-up Center
 Cosmetic Surgery
 Dental Care
 Dermatology
 Detox Center
 Diabetes Center
 Dialysis
 ENT
 Fertility Treatment
 Gastroenterology
 General Surgery
 General Medicine Center
 Hair Removal Center
 Hair Transplant
 Hemodialysis Center
 Hyperbaric Center
 Hyperbaric Oxygen Therapy
 Imaging
 Laser Skin Treatment
 Medical Check-up Center
 Neurology
 Obstetrics - Gynecology
 Ophthalmology
 Orthopedics
 Pediatric Center
 Skincare Center
 Sex Reassignment Surgery
 Urology
 Vein Center

Facilities

Accreditation and Standards 

Yanhee International Hospital has several accreditations and runs under official standardization procedures.  The hospital implemented the International Organization for Standardization (ISO) 9001:2000, and currently maintains that standardization.

Yanhee recently received accreditation from the Joint Commission International Accreditation, USA  which became effective on 22 January 2011, and will run through January 2014. Yanhee also has accreditation from Hospital Accreditation, Thailand.

Awards and recognition 

On May 25, 2012, Yanhee International Hospital was awarded the Reader's Digest Gold Award for Asia's Most Trusted Brands. The Reader's Digest Trusted Brands Survey attempts to identify the top brands that consumers in Asia trust. Scoring for the survey is based on six core ideals: trustworthiness and credibility, quality, value, understanding of customer needs, innovation and social responsibility.

Yanhee International Hospital is known for having particularly knowledgeable and skilled surgeons for sexual reassignment surgery, also known as a sex change operation. One of Yanhee's most famous sex change patients is Beautiful Boxer star Parinya Charoenphol, known publicly as Nong Toom. Nong Toom gained fame and fortune in 1998 as a champion kickboxer at Lumphini Stadium, but in 1999 arrived at Yanhe Hospital to undergo a full sex change operation, changing her male body to the female she currently is today.

The hospital was also featured in an episode of National Geographic Channel's Taboo Series, in which a patient sought sex change surgery at Yanhee.

Yanhee is also known for its famous "rollerblade girls," who zip through the hospital carrying patient documents and internal paperwork, wearing short skirts and rollerblades.

Humanitarian Work 

Yanhee Hospital participates in Operation Bright Smile, a program that manages free surgery and care for children born with a cleft palate. Yanhee Hospital provides surgery for 100 children with cleft lip or palate each year, free of charge, and for the more than 14 years that Yanhee has participated in the program, the hospital has helped more than 1,115 children. Yanhee continues to run the program, which, according to the hospital “lets these children face tomorrow with a brighter smile.”

In 2010, Yanhee Hospital gained popularity for accepting a charity patient who suffered from severe chemical burns on her face, which left her permanently disfigured. She had been denied re-construction surgery by several other hospitals before being accepted at Yanhee, where Dr. Sukit Wangthamran and Dr. Thawatchai Boonpattanapong performed 10 surgeries to alleviate the damage left from the accident. CEO of Yanhee, Dr. Supot Sumritvanitcha, reportedly believed the charity case to be a "good opportunity to let the people know that there is always hope for people who are at the brink of despair but continually reach out in search of a helping hand."

The hospital also organizes blood drives every year, in order to address the consistent problem of blood shortage throughout healthcare institutions. These blood drives occur every three months and Yanhee has conducted more than 15 blood drives since beginning the program.

International Patients and Medical Tourism 

A large number of patients who receive medical care from Yanhee come from overseas; in fact, approximately 9,000 of the people Yanhee serves are foreigners, most of whom travel from Australia, Japan, and the United Arab Emirates. Patients from 27 different countries worldwide arrived at Yanhee in 2009, with 72% of those undergoing cosmetic procedures.

Due to the high number of foreign patients, Yanhee staffs a number of interpreters, and languages spoken at Yanhee include:
 English
 Filipino
 Korean
 Arabic
 French
 Malayu
 Burmese
 German
 Russian
 Cambodian
 Vietnamese
 Thai
 Chinese
 Japanese

Yanhee’s emphasis on beauty enhancement procedures is demonstrated by the fact that, of the total number of international patients that Yanhee serves, 72% receive cosmetic care, 12% receive care in general surgery and medicine, 8% receive dental care, and another 8% receive care in alternative medicine.
Of the total number of cosmetic surgery procedures conducted at Yanhee Hospital, breast augmentation comprises 20%; face lift comprises 16%; blepharoplasty comprises 12%; tummy tuck, nose reshaping and liposuction comprise 9%; breast lift and hair transplantation comprise 5%; nose implants, breast reduction, and varicose vein treatment comprise 3%, hair removal comprises 2%, and other procedures comprise the remaining 1%.

Yanhee is part of an extensive medical tourism network and is a popular destination for foreigners seeking quality medical care, not only for cosmetic purposes, but general health purposes as well.

See also 
 List of hospitals in Thailand
 List of hospitals in Bangkok
 International healthcare accreditation
 Medical tourism

References

External links 
 Official Thai Website of Yanhee International Hospital

Hospitals in Bangkok
Hospitals established in 1984
Bang Phlat district
1984 establishments in Thailand
Surgeons specializing in transgender medicine
Private hospitals in Thailand